68-pounder Lancaster guns were a British rifled muzzle-loading cannon of the 1850s that fired a 68-pound shell. They were fitted in pairs to the Arrow-class gunvessel. The cannon was designed with an oval bore and had a range of about 6500 yards. The gun had a tendency to burst.

References

External links 

Naval guns of the United Kingdom
Victorian-era weapons of the United Kingdom